Pištenik is a mountain in Croatia, located southeast of Plaški and northwest of Saborsko.

References

Mountains of Croatia
Landforms of Karlovac County